Charles Clark (27 May 1917 – 1 March 1943) was an English professional footballer who played as a winger in the Football League for Queens Park Rangers and Luton Town.

Personal life
Clark served as a lance sergeant in the Hampshire Regiment (later the Royal Hampshire Regiment) during the Second World War and died of wounds in Tunisia on 1 March 1943 while serving with the 2/4th Battalion of his regiment. He is buried at Beja War Cemetery.

Career statistics

References

1917 births
Military personnel from Hampshire
1943 deaths
People from Fleet, Hampshire
English footballers
Association football wingers
Queens Park Rangers F.C. players
Luton Town F.C. players
Royal Hampshire Regiment soldiers
British Army personnel killed in World War II